The Swedish Defence Materiel Administration (FMV) is a Swedish government agency that reports to the Ministry of Defence. The agency is responsible for the supply of materiel to the Swedish defence organisation. It is located in Stockholm.

Director Generals since 1968
1968–1975: Sten Wåhlin
1974–1982: Ove Ljung
1982–1988: Carl-Olof Ternryd
1988–1995: Per Borg
1995–2005: Birgitta Böhlin
2005–2012: Gunnar Holmgren
2012–2015: Lena Erixon
2015–2016: Dan Ohlsson (acting)
2016–present: Göran Mårtensson

See also
Government agencies in Sweden

References

External links

1968 establishments in Sweden
Defence agencies of Sweden
Government agencies established in 1968
Government agencies of Sweden
Military logistics of Sweden